Syed Anwar Hussain (born 1 April 1947) was a member of the 14th Lok Sabha of India. He represented the Dhubri constituency of Assam from 2004 to 2009 and is a member of the Indian National Congress (INC) political party.

External links
 Home Page on the Parliament of India's Website

1947 births
Indian National Congress politicians
Living people
Bengali politicians
Indian Muslims
India MPs 2004–2009
People from Bongaigaon district
Lok Sabha members from Assam
Indian National Congress politicians from Assam